Ram Kumar Sharma Kushwaha is an Indian politician and a member of parliament from Sitamarhi (Lok Sabha constituency), Bihar. He won the 2014 Indian general election being a Rashtriya Lok Samta Party candidate.

References

India MPs 2014–2019
Living people
Lok Sabha members from Bihar
People from Sitamarhi district
Rashtriya Lok Samata politicians
1964 births